History of the World (often abbreviated HotW) is a board game designed by Ragnar Brothers and originally published in 1991. It is played by up to six players in seven epochs (6 epochs in the 2009 edition, and 5 epochs in the 2018 edition), each player playing a different empire in each epoch.

Brief history
The first edition of History of the World by Ragnar Brothers was released in 1991 (with a tea-towel board). This first edition sold out in a few weeks, according to Game Designer, Steve Kendall. Following English, Dutch and German versions by various publishers, it was published by Avalon Hill in 1993.  After Avalon Hill was purchased by Hasbro in the early 2000s, History of the World was re released as a big box game. Ragnar Brothers released a revised version of the game, A Brief History of the World, in 2009. The game was then handed to Z-Man Games who created the most recent edition in 2018.

Gameplay
The game is played in seven rounds known as epochs (6 epochs in the 2009 edition, and 5 epochs in the 2018 edition), which correspond to different historical periods.  At the beginning of each epoch, each player receives an empire card and assumes the role of that empire for the round. Each empire has advantages and disadvantages based on the order in which it appears in an epoch, starting location on the world map, its number of armies, navigation abilities (access to certain lands by sea), and whether or not it possesses a capital. Empires not having capitals are known as Marauders and they gain points for sacking other players structures.

During each empire's turn, its allocated units are placed on the board beginning from its capital (or starting space) and proceeding through contiguous areas and controlled seas or oceans. Occupation of empty territory is automatic, while dice-based combat rules are applied if a unit is placed in an area already occupied by another player's forces.

At the end of each player's turn, they are given a score based on how much control they have of regions of the board (known as "Areas") and how many capital, cities, and monuments they possess. The remains of players' empires never move again, but remain on the board for the rest of the game until they are conquered or destroyed by other empires. Players are also given "Greater Events" and "Lesser Events" cards at the beginning of the game, which can be used throughout the game to gain certain advantages.

Influence
The game's concept of scoring based on level of control in a region was cited by designer Jason Matthews as an influence on Twilight Struggle (2005).

Reception
In 1994, History of the World won the Origins Award for "Best Pre-20th Century Boardgame of 1993".

Reviews
Pyramid

References

External links
Play Online (renamed Empires)

Avalon Hill games
Board games introduced in 1991
Board games about history
Origins Award winners
World conquest board games